Jitu Jirati (Jitendra) (born 8 August 1976) is an Indian politician and member of Bhartiya Janta Party. From 2008 to 2013, he was the Member of Legislative Assembly representing the Rau constituency in Madhya Pradesh. He is also a former President of Bharatiya Janata Yuva Morcha in Madhya Pradesh.  In present-day he is serving as the vice-president of M.P. of Bhartiya Janta Party. His father's name is Ramesh Jirati and mother's name is Chandrakala Jirati.

References

1976 births
21st-century Indian politicians
Living people
Bharatiya Janata Party politicians from Madhya Pradesh